Down a Dark Hall is a 2018 supernatural horror film directed by Rodrigo Cortés and written by Chris Sparling and Michael Goldbach (as Mike Goldbach.) It is based on the 1974 novel of the same name by Lois Duncan. Summit Entertainment released it in select theaters and through video-on-demand in the United States on August 17, 2018. Critics surveyed by Rotten Tomatoes called it "more stylish than scary".

Plot
Kit Gordy, a difficult young girl, is sent to the mysterious Blackwood Boarding School after her delinquent behavior becomes too much for her school to handle. When she arrives at Blackwood, Kit meets eccentric headmistress Madame Duret and the school's only other students, four teenage girls with similar behavioral problems (Veronica, Ashley, Sierra, and Izzy). Technology is rarely used, and the girls can only phone their families in the domineering presence of the headmistress. The girls attend a variety of creative and intellectual classes, which begins to draw out unknown talents in them.

Sierra is the first to show a troubling obsession with her work, losing sleep, refusing to eat, and going into odd trances while creating amazing works of art. Ashley writes beautiful poetry and stories that deeply disturb her. Kit and Izzy slowly begin to experience the same bad side effects, saying it was like someone else was using their bodies. Only the belligerent Veronica shows no progress, much to Madame Duret's annoyance. During art class Kit notices that all of Sierra's paintings are signed "TC" and searches the school's library for answers. She realizes that Sierra is recreating paintings by the deceased artist Thomas Cole, and that the others are producing work from other dead geniuses.

Kit convinces Veronica to search the restricted areas of the school, where they come across old student records and more information on the people possessing the girls. When Madame Duret discovers Veronica alone she chains her up in an unused part of the school, explaining that the students are not merely vessels for the dead, but donors, unknowingly sacrificing themselves to be used to continue the careers of famous minds, whom she is able to commune with and channel into the girls' bodies. Kit calls the police and confronts the headmistress about everything. By now Sierra has already died from overwork, and Ashley jumps to her death to stop the possession taking over completely.

While struggling to free Veronica, Kit knocks over some candles, and fire quickly spreads throughout the old building. Izzy succumbs to the beauty of the flames, leaving only Kit and Veronica to escape. Madame Duret is eventually possessed by her former pupils and consumed by the fire. Kit passes out and meets her deceased father, who convinces her to stay and live. She wakes up in the back of an ambulance with her mother by her side.

Cast
 AnnaSophia Robb as Katherine "Kit" Gordy
 Julia Stressen-Reuter as Young Kit
 Uma Thurman as Madame Duret
 Victoria Moroles as Veronica
 Noah Silver as Jules Duret
 Isabelle Fuhrman as Izzy
 Taylor Russell as Ashley
 Rosie Day as Sierra
 Rebecca Front as Miss Olonsky
 Jodhi May as Heather Sinclair
 Pip Torrens as Professor Farley
 Kirsty Mitchell as Ginny
 Jim Sturgeon as Dave
 David Elliot as Robert Gordon
 Brian Bovell as Dr. MacMillan
 Ramiro Blas as Disfigured Man
 Josep Linuesa as Wilhelm Kestler

Production
Stephenie Meyer optioned the Lois Duncan novel in April 2012. In July 2014, Lionsgate acquired the film. Rodrigo Cortés was announced as the director the same day, and screenwriter Chris Sparling was set to work using a previous draft by Michael Goldbach. In early October 2016, AnnaSophia Robb was announced to play the main role, and Taylor Russell joined the cast three days later. On October 24, Victoria Moroles joined the cast as Veronica.

To promote the pending release, Summit Entertainment released a trailer online for the film on May 22, 2018.

Filming
Principal photography began in October 2016 in Barcelona. with Jarin Blaschke as the director of photography. After four weeks of shooting in Barcelona and two weeks in the Canary Islands, filming ended in December 2016.

Release
Down a Dark Hall was released in Italy on August 1, 2018, and in Spain on August 3, 2018. In the United States, the film was released on August 17, 2018, by Summit Entertainment simultaneously in select theaters and via video-on-demand. The film was released on Blu-ray combo pack and DVD on October 16, 2018, by Lionsgate Home Entertainment.

Reception
The site's critics consensus reads: "Down a Dark Hall is more stylish than scary, although its foreboding atmosphere may raise a few goosebumps among younger viewers." On Metacritic, the film has a weighted average score of 56 out of 100, based on 8 critics, indicating "mixed or average reviews".

References

External links
 

2018 horror films
2018 horror thriller films
2010s ghost films
2010s supernatural horror films
2010s supernatural thriller films
American ghost films
American haunted house films
American horror drama films
American horror thriller films
American supernatural horror films
American supernatural thriller films
Films set in boarding schools
Films about spirit possession
Films based on American novels
Films directed by Rodrigo Cortés
Films produced by Wyck Godfrey
Films shot in Barcelona
Films shot in the Canary Islands
Films set in country houses
Gothic horror films
Spanish ghost films
Spanish horror thriller films
Spanish supernatural horror films
Summit Entertainment films
Nostromo Pictures films
2010s English-language films
2010s American films